Marcos Vales Illanes (born 5 April 1975) is a Spanish former footballer who played as a midfielder.

Club career
Born in A Coruña, Vales made his professional debut with local Deportivo de La Coruña. As Super Depor came to fruition, he was sparingly used during his two-year spell with the Galicians, leaving at the age of 19. Only linked to the club with an amateur contract, he moved to Asturias and signed with Sporting de Gijón, with Deportivo president Augusto César Lendoiro proceeding to engage in a lengthy court battle, which was eventually resolved in the footballer's favour.

After three seasons with Sporting, only starting in the latter as the team finished 15th in La Liga, Vales signed with fellow league side Real Zaragoza for 200 million pesetas. He started regularly in his first years, but was already a fringe player in the 2000–01 campaign when the Aragonese won the Copa del Rey.

In the summer of 2002, following Zaragoza's relegation, Vales moved to Sevilla FC also of the top flight. In his first season he was first choice, notably scoring the game's only goal in a local derby against Real Betis on 2 March 2003.

Vales missed the vast majority of 2003–04, due to a foot injury. He then signed with RCD Mallorca, but suffered a relapse in his condition and eventually decided to retire at age 30, with Spanish top tier totals of 228 matches and 18 goals. 

Subsequently, Vales worked in a law firm in his hometown.

International career
On 14 October 1998, Vales earned his first – and only – cap for Spain: it consisted of one minute in a 2–1 win in Israel for the UEFA Euro 2000 qualifiers, after coming on as a substitute for Real Madrid's Raúl.

Previously, he helped the under-21 side win the 1998 European Championship in Romania.

Honours
Spain U21
UEFA European Under-21 Championship: 1998

References

External links

1975 births
Living people
Spanish footballers
Footballers from A Coruña
Association football midfielders
La Liga players
Deportivo de La Coruña players
Sporting de Gijón players
Real Zaragoza players
Sevilla FC players
RCD Mallorca players
Spain youth international footballers
Spain under-21 international footballers
Spain international footballers